Dubuque is a surname. Notable people with the surname include: 

 Alexandre Dubuque (1812-1898), French-Russian composer
 Bill Dubuque, American screenwriter
 Chuck Dubuque (1932–2020), Canadian football player
 Gene Dubuque (1927–1974), American wrestler
 Joe Dubuque (born 1982), American wrestler
 Julien Dubuque (1762–1810), French-Canadian, arrived near what is now Dubuque, Iowa